A30 or A-30 may refer to:

Science
 A30 matriline, the name given to the most commonly seen orca matriline in British Columbia, Canada
 HLA-A30, a human serotype
 A30, ICD10 code for Leprosy and related conditions

Transportation

Air transportation
 Aero A.30, a Czech light bomber developed in the late 1920s
 A-30 Martin Baltimore, an American attack/bomber aircraft
 A30, the IATA location identifier for Scott Valley Airport

Automobiles
 Austin A30, a 1951–1956 British compact car
 Dongfeng Fengshen A30, a 2014–2019 Chinese subcompact sedan
 JAC Heyue A30, 2012–2019 Chinese subcompact sedan

Other
 Cruiser Mk VIII Challenger (A30), a British tank of World War II
 List of A30 roads

Other uses
 Samsung Galaxy A30, smartphone released in 2019
 A30, a code in the Encyclopaedia of Chess Openings for the English Opening